Tuscola is a city in Douglas County, Illinois, United States. The population was 4,636 at the 2020 census. It is the county seat of Douglas County.

History
The founding Supervisor of Tuscola township was O. C. Hackett, who was elected in 1868. Hackett was elected Supervisor with a majority of only one vote over W. B. Ervin. O. C. Hackett was the grandson of noted Kentucky frontiersman and Boonsborough resident Peter Hackett. O. C. planted Hackett's Grove, a sassafras grove situated on Section 31, Township 16, Range 9, on the east side of the township. This   grove is traversed by a branch of Scattering Fork of the Embarrass River, long known as Hackett's Run. According to the History of Douglas County (1884), the grove had been owned by the Hacketts long before Douglas County came into existence. O.C. Hackett's father, John Hackett, settled in nearby Coles County in 1835. Family legend holds that Abraham Lincoln stayed at the Hackett farm during the Lincoln-Douglas debates of 1858.

From the 1890s to the 1940s, Tuscola had a sizeable number of African-American citizens, including Arthur Anderson, the "most graceful walker" at the 1898 Colored Folks Cake Walk in Tuscola; his partner Cozy Chavous; the musician Cecil "Pete" Bridgewater, father of internationally known musicians Cecil Bridgewater and Ronnie Bridgewater; the educator and musician Ruth Calimese, daughter of automobile worker "Big Jim" Calimese; musician Solomon "Sol" Chavous; mail carrier and war veteran Bruce Hayden (father of distinguished violinist Bruce Hayden, Jr.); Lemuel and Nettie Riley; football star and garage owner Tommy Wright; and dozens of other people. Tuscola had two churches with mainly black congregations, the African Methodist Episcopal Church on North Niles, and the White Horse Riders church on Houghton Street.  Unlike the neighboring town of Arcola, Tuscola did not have the ordinance, common in small Illinois towns at the time, that an African-American person could not be on the streets after sundown.  The black and white people of Tuscola got along well. However, between 1922 and 1924 two large Ku Klux Klan gatherings were held in Tuscola.  The 1924 rally consisted of nearly 2,000 Klan cars, a hundred marching Klansmen, burning crosses, and a naturalization ceremony in Tuscola's Ervin Park.

Geography

Climate

Demographics
As of the 2020 census there were 4,636 people, 2,007 households, and 1,157 families residing in the city. The racial makeup of the city was 91.98% White, 0.56% African American, 0.17% Native American, 1.19% Asian, 1.64% from other races, and 4.47% from two or more races. Hispanic or Latino of any race were 3.34% of the population.

There were 2,007 households, out of which 42.05% had children under the age of 18 living with them, 46.39% were married couples living together, 7.52% had a female householder with no husband present, and 42.35% were non-families. 37.32% of all households were made up of individuals, and 15.15% had someone living alone who was 65 years of age or older. The average household size was 2.87 and the average family size was 2.28.

The city's age distribution consisted of 22.2% under the age of 18, 8.9% from 18 to 24, 27.8% from 25 to 44, 27.8% from 45 to 64, and 13.3% who were 65 years of age or older. The median age was 38.6 years. For every 100 females, there were 110.7 males. For every 100 females age 18 and over, there were 107.1 males.

The median income for a household in the city was $65,827, and the median income for a family was $88,309. Males had a median income of $52,143 versus $26,309 for females. The per capita income for the city was $33,316. About 10.3% of families and 11.5% of the population were below the poverty line, including 18.5% of those under age 18 and 8.3% of those age 65 or over.

Education
Tuscola is home to Tuscola Community Unit School District 301 and Tuscola Community High School.

Notable people 

 Marianne Boruch, author
 Smiley Burnette, actor
 James E. Callaway, politician
 John H. Campbell, jurist
 Joseph Gurney Cannon, longtime Speaker of the US House
 Philip F. Deaver, author
 Gary Forrester, author
 Jennie Garth, actress
 Linda Metheny, Olympic gymnast
 Fred Wakefield, NFL football player
 Jean Waters, 1975 Miss Illinois

References

Cities in Douglas County, Illinois
Cities in Illinois
County seats in Illinois
Populated places established in 1868
1868 establishments in Illinois